In mathematics, the method of steepest descent or saddle-point method is an extension of Laplace's method for approximating an integral, where one deforms a contour integral in the complex plane to pass  near a stationary point (saddle point), in roughly the direction of steepest descent or stationary phase. The saddle-point approximation is used with integrals in the complex plane, whereas Laplace’s method is used with real integrals.

The integral to be estimated is often of the form

where C is a contour, and λ is large. One version of the method of steepest descent deforms the contour of integration C into a new path integration C′ so that the following conditions hold:
 C′ passes through one or more zeros of the derivative g′(z),
 the imaginary part of g(z) is constant on C′.

The contour of steepest descent has a minimax property, see .  described some other unpublished notes of Riemann, where he used this method to derive the Riemann–Siegel formula.

Basic idea 
Because the integrand is analytic, the contour  can be deformed into a new contour  without changing the integral. Then and the remaining integral can be approximated with other methods like Laplace's method.

Etymology 
The method is called the method of steepest descent because for analytic , constant phase contours are equivalent to steepest descent contours.

A simple estimate
If

where  denotes the real part, and there exists a positive real number  such that

then the following estimate holds:

Proof of the simple estimate:

The case of a single non-degenerate saddle point

Basic notions and notation 
Let  be a complex -dimensional vector, and

denote the Hessian matrix for a function . If

is a vector function, then its Jacobian matrix is defined as

A non-degenerate saddle point, of a holomorphic function  is a critical point of the function (i.e.) where the function's Hessian matrix has a non-vanishing determinant (i.e.).

The following is the main tool for constructing the asymptotics of integrals in the case of a non-degenerate saddle point:

Complex Morse lemma

The asymptotic expansion in the case of a single non-degenerate saddle point 
Assume
  has a single maximum:  for exactly one point ;
  is a non-degenerate saddle point (i.e.,  and ).

Then, the following asymptotic holds

This statement is a special case of more general results presented in Fedoryuk (1987).

Equation (8) can also be written as

where the branch of

is selected as follows

Consider important special cases:

The case of multiple non-degenerate saddle points 
If the function  has multiple isolated non-degenerate saddle points, i.e.,

where

The partition of unity allows us to construct a set of continuous functions  such that

Whence,

Therefore as  we have:

where equation (13) was utilized at the last stage, and the pre-exponential function  at least must be continuous.

The other cases 

Calculating the asymptotic of

when  is continuous, and  has a degenerate saddle point, is a very rich problem, whose solution heavily relies on the catastrophe theory. Here, the catastrophe theory replaces the Morse lemma, valid only in the non-degenerate case, to transform the function  into one of the multitude of canonical representations.

Integrals with degenerate saddle points naturally appear in many applications including optical caustics and the multidimensional WKB approximation in quantum mechanics.

Extensions and generalizations
An extension of the steepest descent method is the so-called nonlinear stationary phase/steepest descent method. Here, instead of integrals, one needs to evaluate asymptotically solutions of Riemann–Hilbert factorization problems.

Given a contour C in the complex sphere, a function f defined on that contour and a special point, say infinity, one seeks a function M holomorphic away from the contour C, with prescribed jump across C, and with a given normalization at infinity. If f and hence M are matrices rather than scalars this is a problem that in general does not admit an explicit solution.

An asymptotic evaluation is then possible along the lines of the linear stationary phase/steepest descent method. The idea is to reduce asymptotically the solution of the given Riemann–Hilbert problem to that of a simpler, explicitly solvable, Riemann–Hilbert problem. Cauchy's theorem is used to justify deformations  of the jump contour.

The nonlinear stationary phase was introduced by Deift and Zhou in 1993, based on earlier work of the Russian mathematician Alexander Its. A (properly speaking) nonlinear steepest descent method was introduced by Kamvissis, K. McLaughlin and P. Miller in 2003, based on previous work of Lax, Levermore, Deift, Venakides and Zhou. As in the linear case, steepest descent contours solve a min-max problem. In the nonlinear case they turn out to be "S-curves" (defined in a different context back in the 80s by Stahl, Gonchar and Rakhmanov).

The nonlinear stationary phase/steepest descent method has applications to the theory of soliton equations and integrable models, random matrices and combinatorics.

Another extension is the Method of Chester–Friedman–Ursell for coalescing sattle points and uniform asymptotic extensions.

See also
 Pearcey integral
 Stationary phase approximation
 Laplace's method

Notes

References

 English translation in 
.
.
.
 [in Russian].
.
 (Unpublished note, reproduced in Riemann's collected papers.)
 Reprinted in Gesammelte Abhandlungen, Vol. 1. Berlin: Springer-Verlag, 1966.
.
 
.

Asymptotic analysis
Perturbation theory